Big Powderhorn Mountain is a  ski resort located in Gogebic County in the Upper Peninsula of Michigan, within Bessemer Township and Ironwood Township (between the cities of Bessemer and Ironwood). The mountain is part of the Gogebic Range with a summit of 1,640 ft (500m) and a base elevation of 1,240 ft (378m), for a 400 ft. vertical drop. It offers 9 chairlifts accessing 45 trails for Alpine skiing and Snowboarding on 253 skiable acres, with an even mix of easy, intermediate, and difficult trail ratings and two terrain parks. The Wolverine Nordic Trail also connects to the resort for cross-country skiing.

Fire
On January 13, 2011, a fire occurred at the main lodge. No injuries were reported, but the building was declared a total loss. Despite the loss of the building, the resort opened the following day, using the nearby Caribou Lodge as a base for skiers.

A brand new lodge was built next to the Caribou Lodge and opened for the 2012 - 2013 Ski Season.

Ski Lifts 
As of May 2021, Big Powderhorn has 9 Two-Person lifts as well as a rope tow.

Ski Runs 
As of May 2021, Big Powderhorn has 45 Ski Runs

Websites 
 Big Powderhorn Mountain Website
 Big Powderhorn Mountain Resort Lodging
 Big Powderhorn Lodging Association
 Big Powderhorn Ski Patrol
 Wolverine Nordic Ski Club

References

Buildings and structures in Gogebic County, Michigan
Ski areas and resorts in Michigan
Mountains of Michigan
Tourist attractions in Gogebic County, Michigan
Landforms of Gogebic County, Michigan